Thomas Cullen (born 17 July 1985) is a Welsh actor and director. He had roles in the  independent film Weekend (2011), as Anthony Foyle, Viscount Gillingham in the television series Downton Abbey, and as Sir Landry in the historical drama series Knightfall. He also appeared in another historical drama playing the role of Thomas Seymour in Becoming Elizabeth.

Early life
Cullen was born in Aberystwyth. He is the son of two writers. His father is Irish and his mother is English. He spent his early years in Llandrindod Wells and moved to Cardiff at age 12, where he attended Llanishen High School. He has two siblings. 

Before pursuing an acting career he was involved in music. He graduated from the Royal Welsh College of Music and Drama in 2009 with First Class Honours degree in Acting after spending a year at the Central School of Speech and Drama.

Career

Acting
Whilst still in training, Cullen was taken out of the Royal Welsh College of Music and Drama to appear in Daddy's Girl, which won the BAFTA Cymru for Best Film, and to star in Watch Me, which won the BAFTA Cymru for Best Short. His stage roles include Gorgio at the Bristol Old Vic, Assembly and A Good Night Out in the Valleys at National Theatre Wales, and The Sanger at Sherman Cymru. In 2011, he was named on the Screen International Stars of Tomorrow list.

Cullen starred in the 2011 film Weekend as Russell, a Nottingham lifeguard. Weekend collected numerous awards including the Grand Jury award at the Nashville Film Festival and Best Achievement in Production at the British Independent Film Awards. Cullen won Most Promising Newcomer at the British Independent Film Awards and Best Actor at the Nashville Film Festival in 2011 for his role as Russell. His television roles include Jonas in Black Mirror, drug trafficker Yoram in Banged Up Abroad and Richard in Pen Talar. He starred as Wulfric in the 2012 miniseries World Without End. He had a recurring role as Mary Crawley's suitor Anthony Foyle (the Viscount Gillingham) in Downton Abbey.

Recent films include Desert Dancer, the story of Iranian dancer Afshin Ghaffarian, who risked his life to become a dancer despite a nationwide dancing ban, and the science fiction The Last Days on Mars, based around the first crewed mission to Mars. Upcoming films include Happily Ever After, No Compass in the Wilderness, A Hundred Streets opposite Idris Elba and Gemma Arterton, and Mine opposite Armie Hammer.

Cullen played Joe Rose in the new three-part ITV drama The Trials of Jimmy Rose, airing in September 2015. He starred in a Canadian indie from production company Motel Pictures, The Other Half . He plays the lead role of Mark in Harlan Coben's The Five, a ten-part Sky 1 mystery series. He also stars as Landry in the History series Knightfall, which started in December 2017. Cullen played Guy Fawkes alongside Kit Harington and Liv Tyler in Gunpowder on BBC One.

Cullen's editorial work includes L'Uomo Vogue, Vogue Italia, Vanity Fair, and 10 Magazine.

Writing

In 2008, Cullen wrote and produced the short film Naughties with Alexander Vlahos. In 2009, he and Vlahos co-founded the Welsh company Undeb Theatre. He wrote and directed his full-length play, Kingfisher, about a man returning from prison, in 2010, as well as other short plays performed by Undeb.

Directing 

Cullen made his directorial debut with the 2019 film Pink Wall starring Tatiana Maslany and Jay Duplass. The film is described by Screen Daily as "the story of a couple’s struggles with the pressures of gender expectations and the conflict between life and ambition."

Filmography

Film

Television

Awards and nominations

References

External links 

1985 births
Living people
Male actors from Cardiff
People from Powys
People from Aberystwyth
Alumni of the Royal Welsh College of Music & Drama
Welsh male stage actors
Welsh male television actors
Welsh male film actors
21st-century Welsh male actors
Welsh people of Irish descent
Welsh people of English descent
Welsh emigrants to the United States
Welsh expatriates in the United States
British expatriate male actors in the United States
People educated at Llanishen High School